In contract law, a severable contract is a contract that is actually composed of several separate contracts concluded between the same parties, so that failing (breaching) one part of such a 'severable' contract does not breach the whole contract. Therefore, the other party must still honor the other subparts and cannot cancel the whole agreement.  A severable contract generally must contain a "severability clause" that allows certain clauses and aspects of the contract to be "severed" without affecting the validity of the rest of the contract.

For example, if Mr. X purchases a computer, a scanner, a printer and a desk from a retailer, and the retailer cannot deliver the printer, the other parts of the contract (the computer, the scanner and the desk) are still valid and must be honored.

The above example, however, is incomplete.  If Mr. X purchases a computer, scanner, printer and desk as part of a package, with the explicit agreement that all parts must be delivered together, the failure to deliver the printer may be material breach of the entire contract.

In addition, if a contract is made explicitly for a set - such as a complete set of books, furniture or clothes - the failure to deliver the entire set is almost certainly a breach of the entire contract.

Also termed divisible contract.

Contract law